Mohammed Othman Shaween (born 15 February 1986 in Jeddah) is a Saudi Arabian middle distance runner who specializes in the 1500 metres. He received a three-year ban from the sport for doping.

He finished eighth at the 2005 Asian Championships (in 800 m), sixth at the 2006 Asian Games and won the gold medal at the 2007 Asian Championships. He also competed in the 1500 metres at the 2007 World Championships and the 2008 Olympic Games without progressing to the second round.  He won the gold medal in the 2010 Asian Games.

Personal bests
800 metres - 1:48.51 min (2006)
1500 metres - 3:31.82 min (2011)
Mile run - 3:52.00 min (2011)

Doping 
In November 2013 the Saudi Arabia Anti-Doping Committee announced that Shaween had received a three-year ban from the sport for doping after his biological passport had showed abnormalities. The ban ends 12 February 2016.

References

1986 births
Living people
Sportspeople from Jeddah
Saudi Arabian male middle-distance runners
Olympic athletes of Saudi Arabia
Athletes (track and field) at the 2008 Summer Olympics
Athletes (track and field) at the 2012 Summer Olympics
Asian Games gold medalists for Saudi Arabia
Asian Games medalists in athletics (track and field)
Athletes (track and field) at the 2006 Asian Games
Athletes (track and field) at the 2010 Asian Games
Athletes (track and field) at the 2018 Asian Games
Saudi Arabian sportspeople in doping cases
Doping cases in athletics
Medalists at the 2010 Asian Games